Oriole are a London-based band fusing lyrical world music with jazz spontaneity, who create an aural form of Magical Realism. Oriole's members consist of many of the most well established figures in the new British Jazz scene and are perhaps one of the few groups to feature two Mercury nominated artists: Ben Davis on cello and Seb Rochford on drums. They have also released two albums on the F-IRE Collective label. The music of Oriole is composed by prolific guitarist Jonny Phillips (musician).

Discography 
 Song for the Sleeping (F-ire, 2005)
 Migration (F-ire, 2006)
 Every New Day (F-ire, 2012)

Compilation albums
F-ire Works Vol. 1  (F-ire, 2006)
F-ire Works Vol. 2  (F-ire, 2007)
ZOOM! European Jazz Collective (F-ire, 2007)

Personnel
 Jonny Phillips - guitar
 Ingrid Laubrock - tenor saxophone
 Ben Davis - cello
 Idris Rahman - tenor saxophone
 Nick Ramm - piano
 Adriano Adewale - percussion
 Ruth Goller - bass
 Fernando De Marco - bass
 Seb Rochford - drums 
 Guests and previous members have included Sarah Homer, Julia Biel, Okou, Steve Buckley, Guillermo Rozenthuler, Paul Clarvis and Anders Christensen.

References

External links
 Oriole-music.co.uk
 F-ire.com
 myspace/oriole2
 Jonnyphillips.com

Musical groups from London
Jazz fusion